Joshua David Fines (born 7 July 1996) is a footballer. Born in England, he represents the British Virgin Islands national team at international level.  Besides England, he has played in the United States.

International career
Fines decided to commit to British Virgin Islands Football Association ahead of the 2016 Caribbean Cup.

Career statistics

References

External links
 

Living people
1996 births
British Virgin Islands footballers
British Virgin Islands international footballers
English expatriate sportspeople in the United States
British Virgin Islands expatriates in the United States
Expatriate soccer players in the United States
People from Farnborough, Hampshire
Camberley Town F.C. players
Sandhurst Town F.C. players
Association football defenders
Andrew College alumni
Footballers from Hampshire
English footballers
English expatriate footballers